Troitsky District is the name of several administrative and municipal districts in Russia:
Troitsky District, Altai Krai, an administrative and municipal district of Altai Krai
Troitsky District, Chelyabinsk Oblast, an administrative and municipal district of Chelyabinsk Oblast

See also
Troitsky (disambiguation)
Troitsky Okrug (disambiguation)

References